Gedda is a Swedish family with Gude Axelsen Giedde (1510-1590) as earliest attested primogenitor. Georg Gedda was ennobled (n:o 2168) by King Gustav IV Adolf of Sweden in 1797.

Speculations of whether Gude Axelsen Giedde was the great-grandson of :sv:Erengisle Gädda of the Swedish noble family Gädda from Småland, Sweden, remain unattested. In any case, he became the asserted primogenitor of the Gedda family ennobled in 1791.

References

Bibliography
 Gedda, Torsten: Släkten Gedda från Bohuslän, Strokirks Bokindustri, Skövde (1953)

Norwegian families
Swedish noble families
Families of Norwegian ancestry